Pilea involucrata, commonly called the friendship plant, is a bushy trailing plant which is sometimes cultivated, especially where high humidity can be provided, such as in a terrarium.  It is native to Central and South America.

References

External links

involucrata